Baén (in Spanish: Bahent) is a hamlet located in the municipality of Baix Pallars, in Province of Lleida province, Catalonia, Spain. As of 2020, it has a population of 10.

Geography 
Baén is located 126km north-northeast of Lleida.

References

Populated places in the Province of Lleida